Tariq ut-tahqiq is one of the books attributed to Hakim Sanai Ghaznavi. This is The old Persian mystical poetry book from year 528 AH in Masnavi form. This book was published in Persian by Mohammad Taghi Modarres Razavi under the name "Masnavi of Sanai" in 1969 with association of the University of Tehran Press.

Sample poem
For example, a poem called Litany from this book translated to english as follows:

See also
 Hadiqat al Haqiqa
 Seir al-Ebad elal-Ma'ad
 Karnameye Balkh
 Karname-ye Ardeshir-e Babakan
 Matigan-i Hazar Datistan
 Sheikh San'Aan

References

External links
 Tariq ut-tahqiq on Amazon
 SANĀʾI on iranicaonline
 Sanai's books on Goodreads
 Hakim Sanai Poems

Sanai works